La Guirlande de Campra is collaborative orchestral work written by seven French composers in 1952. It is in the form of variations or meditations on a theme from André Campra's 1717 opera Camille, reine des Volsques.

The numbers and their composers are:
Toccata (Arthur Honegger*)
Sarabande et farandole (Daniel-Lesur)
Canarie (Alexis Roland-Manuel)
Sarabande (Germaine Tailleferre*)
Matelote provençale (Francis Poulenc*)
Variation (Henri Sauguet)
Écossaise (Georges Auric*)
*Member of the group Les Six

The work was first performed on 30 July 1952 at the Aix-en-Provence Festival, by the Orchestre de la Société des Concerts du Conservatoire, under conductor Hans Rosbaud.

Benjamin Britten attended the premiere, and it gave him the idea of commissioning several composers to contribute to a set of Variations on an Elizabethan Theme to celebrate the forthcoming coronation of Elizabeth II, for which he was also writing his opera Gloriana.

Adaptations 
In 1966, a ballet, La Guirlande de Campra, was choreographed by John Taras and presented by New York City Ballet.

References 

Collaborations in classical music
Compositions for symphony orchestra
Variations
1952 compositions
Compositions by Arthur Honegger
Compositions by Germaine Tailleferre
Compositions by Francis Poulenc
Compositions by Georges Auric